David A. Baker is an American activist. A former union organizer, Baker is the founder and director of Community Against Pollution.

Background
Baker is from Anniston, Alabama. As children, he and his younger brother Terry would play in ditches and cross the water in the ditches that were used for the Monsanto plant run-off.

In 1970  his brother died of brain and lung cancer at the age of 17. Baker believes that this was caused by PCBs in the environment. Since then he has been instrumental in getting lawyers to represent the people who appear to be the victims of PCB poisoning.

In 1995 while he was working for an environmental company, he accidentally discovered that the presence of PCB's had been covered up for 50 years.

Recent & current
He is the founder and Executive Director of the organization Community Against Pollution.

He was also active in the organisation of a team of workers going to help in the clean-up of the Gulf of Mexico oil spill.

Organization membership
 Community Against Pollution (Founder / Director)
 Environmental Working Group (Board of Directors)
 Coalition of Black Trade Unionists (Member)
 Calhoun County Chapter of the NAACP (Vice-President)

Video
 The GMWatch video collection ... (Contributor) 
 The World According to Monsanto ... (Himself)

Awards
 EPA 1st Assistant Administrator's Environmental Justice Incentive Award 2003
 CARAT Team Award

References

Living people
African-American trade unionists
NAACP activists
American environmentalists
People from Anniston, Alabama
Trade unionists from Alabama
Year of birth missing (living people)
21st-century African-American people